Brian McArdle (1911–2002) was a British medical doctor and researcher.

McArdle published a paper in 1951 entitled “Myopathy due to a defect in muscle glycogen breakdown”. The paper described a young man with a lifelong history of exertional muscle pain and stiffness – symptoms that previous doctors had dismissed as imagined. This is what we now know as Glycogen Storage Disease Type V. Since then the molecular and genetic basis of the disease has been identified. Glycogen storage disease type V was named for him as McArdle's disease.

References

20th-century British medical doctors
1911 births
2002 deaths